The 2016 AFL Women's draft consisted of the various periods when the eight clubs in the AFL Women's competition recruited players prior to the competition's inaugural season in 2017.

Draftees and signings over the period were required to have a minimum age qualification of 18. Prior to the draft itself each club was allowed to sign two marquee players from any state across the country at an increased salary. In addition, they were permitted to sign a number of priority players with existing connections to the club, and up to two rookie players who had not played competitive Australian rules football within the previous three years. All remaining players entered the draft and became eligible to be selected by any team based in their nominated state-based zone.

Marquee signings
On 27 July 2016, each of the competition's eight teams announced their two marquee player signings allowed prior to the October draft.

Priority players
Under the priority selection rules, Carlton, Collingwood, Melbourne, the Western Bulldogs and Fremantle were allowed one player, Adelaide and Brisbane were allowed two players, and Greater Western Sydney was allowed four. Due to injuries to their marquee players, Fremantle and Greater Western Sydney were permitted an additional priority pick, allowing for two and five in total, respectively.

Rookie players

Draft
A state based draft was held on 12 October 2016. The draft order was determined by random draw on 29 September. The draft operated in snake formation with the club holding the first selection of the first round also holding the last selection of the second round and so on and so forth.

Free agents
Each team had until 31 October 2016 to sign further undrafted/free-agent players to complete their list of 25 senior listed players.

See also
 2016 AFL draft

References

AFL Women's draft
Draft
AFL women's draft
2010s in Melbourne
Australian rules football in Victoria (Australia)
Sport in Melbourne
Events in Melbourne